Selwyn Kole Mawetaral (born 26 December 1973) is a retired middle distance athlete from the Solomon Islands.

Kole represented the Solomon Islands team that compete at the 1996 Summer Olympics which was held in Atlanta. He entered the 1500 metres, he finished 12th in his heat so didn't advance to the next round. In 1995 he competed at the 1995 World Championships in Athletics held in Gothenburg, he finished last in his heat.

References

External links
 

1973 births
Living people
People from Guadalcanal Province
Solomon Islands male middle-distance runners
Athletes (track and field) at the 1996 Summer Olympics
Olympic athletes of the Solomon Islands
World Athletics Championships athletes for Solomon Islands